Midnight Lovers is a 1926 American silent romantic war comedy film directed by John Francis Dillon and distributed by First National Pictures. It starred Lewis Stone and Anna Q. Nilsson. It was based on the play Collusion by J. E. Harold Terry.

Prints of the film are preserved at the Library of Congress and the Wisconsin Center for Film and Theater Research, Madison.

Cast
Lewis Stone as Major William Ridgewell, RFC
Anna Q. Nilsson as Diana Fothergill
John Roche as Owen Ffolliott
Chester Conklin as Moriarty
Dale Fuller as Heatley
Purnell Pratt as Wibley
Harvey Clark as Archer

References

External links

Still at silenthollywood.com

1926 films
American silent feature films
Films directed by John Francis Dillon
First National Pictures films
1926 romantic comedy films
American romantic comedy films
American black-and-white films
1920s American films
Silent romantic comedy films
Silent American comedy films